Sheila Syvret is a former international lawn bowler from Jersey.

She won a silver medal in the pairs at the 1992 World Outdoor Bowls Championship in Ayr with Mavis Le Marquand and four years later repeated the success by claiming another pairs silver at the 1996 World Outdoor Bowls Championship in Leamington Spa, with Jean Jones.

She also competed in three Commonwealth games in 1990, 1994 and 2002.

References

Jersey female bowls players
Bowls players at the 1990 Commonwealth Games
Bowls players at the 1994 Commonwealth Games
Bowls players at the 2002 Commonwealth Games
1943 births
Living people
Commonwealth Games competitors for Jersey